Adelaida Fernando-Villegas (born Adelaida Marquez Fernando; March 17, 1914 – August 30, 2004), better known as Dely Atay-Atayan or Adelaida Fernando, was a Filipina comedian and singer. Her career in entertainment spanned seven decades, beginning in bodabil and ending in television.

Biography
Atay-Atayan was born in Tondo, Manila. One of her younger brothers, Ading Fernando, would grow up to be a prominent television comedian and director.

Atay-Atayan had completed her second year in high school when she broke into showbusiness as a kundiman singer at the Palace Theater in Manila. From 1930 to 1934, she toured with a bodabil troupe, billing herself as "The Queen of Laughs". She made her film debut in 1940 with Lakambini, where she played opposite her husband, comedian Andoy Balunbalunan. After Balunbalunan's death, she married Catalino Ong.

Career
From 1940 until 1994, Atay-Atayan appeared in over 300 films. She was also a popular comedian on radio, starring in programs such as Tangtarang-Tang. She formed a comedic quartet with Pugak, Lopito and Doro de los Ojos, calling themselves "Ancient Fox".

Her most famous role was as Doña Delilah, the wealthy, imperious and disapproving mother-in-law of John Puruntong (Dolphy) in the RPN sitcom John en Marsha, which was created by her brother Ading and ran for seventeen years. Her portrayal proved as the definitive "mother-in-law" archetype in Filipino popular culture. Her famous tagline, uttered without fail in every episode to John Puruntong, was a scathing admonition: "Magsumikap ka!" ("Strive harder!") She also popularized the Filipino catchphrase "Hudas! Barabas! Hestas!" in this sitcom.

Atay-Atayan had another famous role as the mother of Vic Ungassis (played by Vic Sotto) in a sitcom of Iskul Bukol. Her character came from the town of Tiaong, Quezon and popularized the term of endearment "Bunsoy!" for addressing Vic. The root word "bunso" is Tagalog for youngest child.

Her last movie was Chick Boy in 1994 following her retirement in the same year.

Illness, retirement and death
Atay-Atayan retired in 1994. She had been bedridden for two years prior. She died on August 30, 2004, in Parañaque.

Filmography

Film
1938 - Lakambini [Cervantina Filipina Corp.]
1940 - Libingang Bakal [Filippine]
1940 - Gunita [Sampaguita]
1940 - Nag-iisang Sangla [LVN]
1947 - Bakya Mo Neneng [Premiere]
1948 - Ang Anghel sa Lupa [Premiere]
1948 - Wala na Akong Iluha [Premiere]
1948 - Itanong mo sa Bulaklak [Premiere]
1948 - Bulaklak at Paruparo [Premiere]
1948 - Maliit Lamang ang Daigdig [Premiere]
1948 - Isang Dakot na Bigas [Premiere]
1949 - Kayumanggi [Premiere]
1949 - Anak ng Panday [Premiere]
1949 - Halik sa Bandila [Premiere]
1949 - Kumander Sundang [Premiere]
1949 - Kay Ganda ng Umaga [Premiere]
1949 - Dugo ng Katipunan [Premiere]
1949 - Padre Burgos [Premiere]
1950 - 48 Oras [Premiere]
1950 - Tatlong Balaraw [Premiere]
1950 - Kenkoy [Premiere]
1951 - Bahay na Tisa [Premiere]
1951 - Diego Silang [Premiere]
1952 - Nicomedes [Premiere]
1953 - Highway 54 [LGS]
1953 - Kambal na Lihim [LGS]
1953 - Tayo'y Mag-aliw [Premiere]
1953 - Sa Hirap at Ginhawa [Maria Clara]
1953 - Tampalasan [LGS]
1954 - Selosong Balo [V]
1954 - May Bakas Ang Lumipas [Ace York]
1956 - Mr. & Mrs. [People's]
1956 - Bella Filipina [Premiere]
1957 - Bicol Express [Premiere]
1957 - H-Line Gang [Premiere]
1958 - Kilabot sa Sta. Barbara [Tamaraw Studios]
1959 - Ang Kanyang Kamahalan [Premiere]
1959 - Big Time Berto [Larry Santiago]
1959 - Pitong Gatang [Premiere]
1968 - Buhay Bombero1969 - Facifica Falaypay [RVQ Productions]
1969 - Impasse1970 - With These Hands1972 - Love Pinoy Style [RVQ Productions]
1973 - John and Marsha [RVQ Productions]
1976 - Magsikap: Kayod sa Araw, Kayod sa Gabi1976 - John and Marsha 2 [RVQ Productions]
1977 - Omeng Satanasia1977 - John and Marsha 3 [RVQ Productions]
1977 - Silang mga Mukhang Pera1980 - John and Marsha 4 [RVQ Productions]
1981 - Tropang Bulilit1984 - Da Best of John & Marsha [RVQ Productions]
1985 - Ride on Baby1985 - Kapag Baboy ang Inutang1985 - John and Marsha sa Probinsya [RVQ Productions]
1985 - Like Father, Like Son1988 - Baleleng at ang Ginto Sirena1988 - Haw Haw de Karabaw1989 - Everlasting Love1990 - Samson & Goliath [M-Zet Films]
1991 - John and Marsha '91 [RVQ Productions]
1994 - Chick Boy'' [OctoArts Films]

Television

Notes

References

External links

1914 births
2004 deaths
People from Tondo, Manila
Actresses from Manila
Filipino television personalities
20th-century Filipino women singers